The Airdrie Thunder are a Junior "B" Ice Hockey team based in Airdrie, Alberta, Canada. They are members of the North Division of the Heritage Junior B Hockey League (HJHL). They play their home games at Ron Ebbesen Arena.

History 

Division titles won: 2005, 2007, 2008, 2009, 2019
League Championships won: 1997, 2000, 2019
Alberta Provincial entries: 1997, 2000, 2005, 2019
Alberta Provincial titles: 2019
Keystone Cup titles: none

The Airdrie Thunder developed an intense rivalry with their former divisional counterparts, the Okotoks Bisons.  The Thunder handed the Bisons their only two losses in the 2005–06 season, while the four victories for Okotoks were the only four games the Thunder lost.  The Bisons eliminated the Thunder in the league semi-finals.

The two rivals also met in the 2005 HJHL finals, with Okotoks again coming out the victors in a tough five-game series.  Despite losing the championship, the Thunder qualified for the Alberta Provincials, held in Calgary but failed to advance to the medal round.

Airdrie's best season to date was 1999–2000, when they captured their second league title in four years before going on to win the silver medal at the Alberta Provincial Junior B Hockey Championship, which was also hosted by the Thunder.

The Thunder have played in the North Division since 2011–12. In recent years the Thunder have developed a heated rivalry with the Red Deer Vipers. The Vipers and Thunder have now met in three consecutive playoff series. The Thunder knocked off Red Deer in seven games in the 2016 north semi-final. The Vipers have exacted revenge twice since, beating Airdrie in six games in the 2017 north semi-final and 2018 north final.

Season-by-season record

Note: GP = Games played, W = Wins, L = Losses, T = Ties, OTL = Overtime Losses, Pts = Points, GF = Goals for, GA = Goals against, PIM = Penalties in minutes

Russ Barnes Trophy
Alberta Jr B Provincial Championships

Alberta withdrew from Keystone Cup - Western Canada Jr. B Championships

See also
List of ice hockey teams in Alberta

External links
Official website of the Airdrie Thunder

Ice hockey teams in Alberta
Airdrie, Alberta